Ardeadoris scottjohnsoni is a species of sea slug, a dorid nudibranch, a shell-less marine gastropod mollusk in the family Chromodorididae.

Distribution 
This species was described from Hawaii. It seems to be endemic to the Hawaiian Islands.

Description 
This nudibranch has a white body with a yellow-edged mantle border. Its gills have white bases with black tips and the rhinophores have transparent bases and black clubs, with a thin electric-blue vertical line.

Ecology

References

Chromodorididae
Gastropods described in 1989